The Lower Andes tree frog (Boana melanopleura) is a species of frog in the family Hylidae endemic to Peru. Its natural habitats are subtropical or tropical moist montane forests, rivers, freshwater marshes, and intermittent freshwater marshes.

Sources

Boana
Amphibians of Peru
Amphibians described in 1912
Taxonomy articles created by Polbot